Mon Mane Na is an Indian Bengali drama television series which premiered on 30 August 2021 on Colors Bangla and digital platform Voot. It stars Pallavi Dey, Samm Batyacharyya, and Anjana Basu. The show is produced by Surinder Films. It ended on 5 June 2022. During the time span of this show, Pallavi Dey committed suicide and was declared dead on 15 May 2022 and for that, the makers showed the death of Pallavi's onscreen character Gouri and ended on a sat note.

Plot 
A rustic love story of Gauri and Rudra, two lovers caught in Boro Ma and Shardul Gonshai's political powerplay. Based in Akandapur, rural Bengal, this is an action-packed story of romance and how love triumphs all. Their lives go into major obstacles, but they fight together to beat it. However, their lives changed after the sudden death of Gauri, and the truth about Rudra's parentage. At the end, Rudra and Boro Ma has caught the persons involved at Gauri's murder. After accomplishing all the tasks to find Gauri's murderers, Boro Ma leaves Akandapur to find Kaberi, but before Boro Ma leaves for good, Rudra accepts Boro Ma as her mother, and they remember Gauri.

Cast

Main

Recurring

Guests

Production

Release
The team started shooting for the series in early July 2022, with the first promo starring the two leads (Pallavi and Samm) released in late July. Another promo was released introducing Anjana's character "Boro Ma" included with the two leads (Pallavi and Samm) days later with the release date being shown.

Casting
Pallavi Dey was cast as the female lead in early June 2021, days after her last show, Saraswatir Prem, ended. Samm Batyacharyya was cast as the male lead and Anjana Basu as the third lead. Then, the ensemble casts, which are Bharat Kaul, Suchismita Chowdhury, Shakshi Roy, Arnab Banerjee, and Jayasree Mukherjee were finalized as the Burman Family (Rudra's family). Meanwhile, the second ensemble casts, which are Bimal Chakraborty, Nabonita Dey, and Debomoy Mukherjee were finalized as the Chatterjee Family (Gauri's family before the marriage). They are followed by Saheli Banerjee, Joyjit Banerjee, Arunava Dutta, Anamitra Batabyal, Prasanta Sutradhar, and Amritendu Kar as recurring members of the show, essaying the roles of Payel, Shardul, Montu, Lokesh, Bhola, and Nandu, respectively.

In late July 2021, Devojit Mukherjee was cast as Gaurav, but exited just weeks after the show started and his character was killed. In December 2021, Atmadeep Ghosh was cast as Ritesh, Akandapur's chief police and ally of Boro Ma, who fell in love with Tuktuki, Rudra's sister. In January 2022, Sampriti Poddar was cast as Hiya, Rudra's former girlfriend whom they thought has died, and she exited the show by February. In February 2022, the second ensemble cast (Chatterjee Family) consisting of Bimal Chakraborty, Nabonita Dey, and Debomoy Mukherjee exited the show. In March 2022, Anamitra Batabyal, who is essaying the role of Lokesh, took a break from the series, and was shown as shot by Boro Ma and is presumed dead. He came back in May 2022 and stayed until the end of the show.

Cancellation
Prior to the timeslot change, Mon Mane Na is airing at 7:30PM. But owing to low ratings, the show was moved to 9:00PM in May 2022 to give way for a new show, Tumpa Autowali.

On 15 May 2022, the female protagonist, Pallavi Dey died due to suicide, hence leaving her role vacant for 2 days until makers has decided to kill off her character (Gauri).

Before the death of Pallavi, the show's track is about Gauri knowing the real parents of Rudra, and a promo was released in 14 May, a day before her death. But, after the tragedy, the makers edited their storyline to focus on Rudra's quest to find Gauri's killers and his real parents.

The producers decided not to extend the show as there will be no essence on the show if one of the leads are missing. They wrapped up their shoot on 20 May 2022 and the show ended on 5 June 2022. During the last episode, a tribute to Pallavi was broadcast at the end and was also posted in Colors Bangla's Instagram. The show was replaced by Tumii Je Amar Maa the following day, 6 June.

Location
Based on a fictional location of Akandapur, West Bengal as backdrop, Mon Mane Na was mainly filmed at Technicians' Studio located in Kolkata. The first promo was shot in the banks of Hooghly River, also located in West Bengal.

Adaptations

References

External links 

Colors Bangla original programming
2021 Indian television series debuts
2022 Indian television series endings